Margarella expansa is a species of sea snail, a marine gastropod mollusk in the family Calliostomatidae.

Description
The shell grows to a height of 14.1 mm. The thin, imperforate shell has a depressed-conoidal shape. It is shining, of a light olivaceous tint or somewhat tinged with pink. Its surface is smooth. The acute spire  is conoidal. The sutures are slightly impressed. The shell contains about 42 rapidly widening whorls. The large body whorl is rounded at the periphery and a little impressed or margined below the suture. The large aperture is rounded and angular above, green and iridescent inside. The columellar margin is a little straightened. The umbilico-columellar tract is slightly excavated.

Distribution
This marine species occurs off the Falkland Islands and in the Straits of Magellan at depths between 0 m and 150 m.

References

 Petit R.E. (2009) George Brettingham Sowerby, I, II & III: their conchological publications and molluscan taxa. Zootaxa 2189: 1–218

External links
 To Antarctic Invertebrates
 To Barcode of Life
 To Biodiversity Heritage Library (8 publications)
 To Encyclopedia of Life
 To USNM Invertebrate Zoology Mollusca Collection
 To World Register of Marine Species
 

expansa
Gastropods described in 1838